William Wallace Screws (1839–1913) served as the 19th Secretary of State of Alabama from 1878 to 1882.

Biography 
He was born on February 25, 1839, at Jernigan, Barbour, now Russell County, Alabama to Benjamin Screws and Mourning Jones Drake.

He received his education in the village schools in Glenville, Alabama until he was sixteen. He did not go to college and instead read law under Thomas H. Watts. He was admitted to the Montgomery County Bar on June 15, 1859, and entered the practice of law.

Civil War 
He opposed the secession but enlisted as a volunteer into Hilliard's Alabama Legion at the outbreak of the American Civil War. He served in Tennessee and Kentucky and took part in the Battle of Chickamauga. In November 1963 he was commissioned as the first lieutenant in the 59th Alabama Infantry Regiment. Screws ended the war as major serving on the staff of Gen. James T. Holtzclaw. He published letters from the front in the Montgomery Advertiser describing his war experiences.

Later life 
After the war Montgomery Advertiser publisher Samuel Graham Reid, Sr., hired Screws as an associate editor in July 1865 and then in November of the same year sold him a half interest in the newspaper. For the next forty-eight years Screws maintained to a varying degree an editorial connection with the Advertiser. 
 
In 1878–1882, he served as the Secretary of State of Alabama.

Screws received an honorary degree from the University of Alabama in 1906.

He died August 7, 1913, at Coosada, Alabama.

Governor Thomas G. Jones pronounced in his eulogy for William W. Screws the following,

Family 
On April 25, 1867, he married Emily Frances and they had four children.

References

External links 
 Alabama Authors: Screws, William Wallace

1839 births
1913 deaths
Alabama Democrats
People of Alabama in the American Civil War
Military personnel from Montgomery, Alabama
Editors of Alabama newspapers
Secretaries of State of Alabama